Margaret Hall  may refer to:

Places
 Lady Margaret Hall, Oxford, the first women's college in Oxford, named after Lady Margaret Beaufort
 Margaret Addison Hall, part of Victoria University, Toronto

People
 Margaret Bernadine Hall (1863–1910), English painter most notable for her painting Fantine, which hangs in the Walker Art Gallery, Liverpool
 Margaret Hall (designer) OBE, RDI-awarded in 1974 for her exhibitions
 Margaret Hall (photographer), (1876 – 1963)

See also